The Mao-it River is a tributary of the Sibalom River located in Antique province in the Philippines.

References

Rivers of the Philippines
Landforms of Antique (province)